This is a list of notable courthouses. These are buildings that have primarily been used to host a court. In some countries, "courthouse" is not the term used, instead the term for the building is simply "court".  Courthouses have often been designed to be architecturally grand or imposing.

International

Courthouses of courts having international scope include:
Peace Palace, in The Hague, Netherlands, seat of International Court of Justice of the United Nations
European Court of Human Rights, Strasbourg, France
Future permanent premises of the International Criminal Court, The Hague
Building of the Caribbean Court of Justice, Port of Spain, Trinidad and Tobago
Building(s) of the Inter-American Court of Human Rights, San José, Costa Rica

Europe

Albania
Constitutional Court of Albania
Supreme Court of Albania

Belgium 

 Palace of Justice Antwerp
 Palace of Justice, Brussels

Denmark
Copenhagen Court House
Courthouse and Jail, Esbjerg
Frederiksberg Courthouse

France
Palais de justice historique de Lyon
Palais de Justice, Paris
Palais de Justice, Strasbourg

Germany
Kammergericht, Berlin
Kriminalgericht, Berlin
Landgericht Berlin
Justizpalast (Munich)
Palace of Justice, Nuremberg

Ireland
Four Courts
Criminal Courts of Justice (Dublin)
Green Street Court House

Italy
Tribunal of Florence
Palace of Justice, Rome

Malta

Auberge d'Auvergne, formerly a courthouse
Auberge d'Italie, formerly a courthouse
Banca Giuratale (Mdina), formerly a courthouse
Castellania, formerly a courthouse
Corte Capitanale, formerly a courthouse
Courts of Justice building (Valletta)
Inquisitor's Palace, formerly a courthouse

Netherlands

Supreme Court of the Netherlands, The Hague
Hoge Raad der Nederlanden / Huis Huguetan
Modern building(s) of the Supreme Court of the Netherlands
Rechthuis (Bellingwolde), former courthouse used 1643-1811, a national historic site since 1972, now a private residence

Romania
Palace of Justice, Bucharest
Tulcea Art Museum, a former courthouse

Sweden
Bonde Palace
Stockholm Court House
Wrangel Palace

United Kingdom

Scotland

Edinburgh Sheriff Court
Glasgow Sheriff Court
Hamilton Sheriff Court
Paisley Sheriff Court

England and Wales

List of Crown Court venues in England and Wales
List of county court venues in England and Wales
List of former county courts in Wales

Other Europe

Palace of Justice, Vienna, Austria
Palais de Justice, Brussels, Belgium
Sofia Court House, Bulgaria
Helsinki Court House, Finland
Judiciary City, Luxembourg
Oslo Courthouse, Norway
Courthouse in Września, Poland
Courthouse (Ljubljana), Slovenia
Istanbul Justice Palace, Turkey

Americas

Canada

Calgary Courts Centre, Alberta
Law Courts (Edmonton), Alberta
Law Courts (Vancouver), British Columbia
Vancouver Art Gallery, British Columbia
Charlotte County Court House, New Brunswick, the oldest Canadian courthouse in continuous operation
Moncton Law Courts, New Brunswick
Halifax Court House, Nova Scotia
Kings County Museum, Nova Scotia
A. Grenville and William Davis Courthouse, Ontario
Adelaide Street Court House, Ontario, a former one
Frontenac County Court House, Ontario
Old City Hall (Guelph), Ontario
Old City Hall (Toronto), Ontario
Old Newmarket Town Hall and Courthouse, Ontario
Osgoode Hall, Ontario
Ottawa Courthouse, Ontario
Peel County Courthouse, Ontario
Renfrew County Courthouse, Ontario

Second Supreme Court of Canada building, Ottawa, Ontario
Supreme Court of Canada, Ottawa, Ontario
Toronto Courthouse, Ontario
Édifice Ernest-Cormier, Quebec, a former courthouse
Édifice Lucien-Saulnier, Quebec
Palais de justice (Montreal), Quebec
Battleford Court House, Saskatchewan
Moose Jaw Court House, Saskatchewan

United States

Mexico
Supreme Court of Justice of the Nation, Mexico City, Mexico

South America
Palace of Justice of the Argentine Nation. Argentina
Palacio de los Tribunales de Justicia de Santiago, Chile
Palace of Justice, Lima, Peru
Palacio de Justicia de Caracas, Venezuela

Asia

India
Bombay High Court, India
Madras High Court, India
Patiala House Courts Complex, India
Tis Hazari Courts Complex, India

Malaysia
Kuala Lumpur Courts Complex
Palace of Justice, Putrajaya

Other Asia
Old High Court Building, Dhaka, Bangladesh
Former Central Magistracy, Hong Kong, a former courthouse
Court of Final Appeal Building, Hong Kong, a former courthouse
Old Supreme Court Building, Singapore

Africa and Middle East
El-Hakaneia Palace, Alexandria, Egypt
Temple of Justice, Liberia
Mahkamah Mosque, a former courthouse in Palestine
Courthouse of Tehran, Iran

Australia and Pacific

Australia

in Australian Capital Territory
High Court of Australia, Canberra

in New South Wales
Courthouses in New South Wales, including:
Downing Centre, Sydney
Parramatta Justice Precinct, Sydney

in Queensland

Atherton Courthouse
Ayr Court House
Bowen Courthouse
Brisbane Magistrates Court
Bundaberg Police Station
Charters Towers Courthouse
Childers Court House
Cloncurry Courthouse
Drystone Wall, Melton Hill
Gladstone Court House
Gympie Court House
Ingham Court House
Innisfail Courthouse
Ipswich Courthouse
Law Courts, Brisbane
Mackay Court House and Police Station
Mackay Courthouse
Maryborough Courthouse
Mount Morgan Court House and Police Station
Old Cleveland Police Station
Old Ipswich Courthouse
Old Toowoomba Court House
Pomona Court House
Queen Elizabeth II Courts of Law, Brisbane
Rockhampton Courthouse
Roma Courthouse
Rosewood Courthouse
Southport Courthouse
St Lawrence Police Station
Toowoomba Court House
Townsville Magistrates Court
Tully Court House
Warwick Court House

in South Australia

in Victoria
Supreme Court of Victoria, Melbourne
Former Melbourne Magistrates' Court, Melbourne
Melbourne Magistrates' Court, Melbourne
Supreme Court of Victoria, Melbourne

in Western Australia
Children's Court of Western Australia, Perth
District Court of Western Australia, Perth
Family Court of Western Australia, Perth
Magistrates Court of Western Australia, Perth
Old Court House, Perth, Perth, constructed 1896-97, used until 1902 
Supreme Court of Western Australia, Perth
Toodyay Court House, Toodyay

New Zealand
Dunedin Law Courts

References

Courthouses